Strophiceras is an extinct genus of cephalopods from the Order Nautilida, which includes, in a separate family, Nautilus and Allonautilus.

Strophioceras, a gyrogonic form that comes from the Middle Devonian of Europe and named by Hyatt in 1844 is part of the Trigonoceratacean family Centroceratidae which was extant from the Devonian to the Early Permian. ( 1954. Flower 1950)

Description

See also

 Nautiloidea
 Nautilida
 List of nautiloids

References

 Flower and Kummel 1950. A Classification of the Nautiloidea; Jour Paleontology, 24(5), 606–616, Nov 1950.
 , B. 1964. Nautiloidea - Nautilida; Treatise on Invertebrate Paleontology Part K, Mollusca 3; R.C. Moore (ed), Univ. Kans. press.
 Sepkoski, J.J. Jr. 2002. A compendium of fossil marine animal genera. D.J. Jablonski & M.L. Foote (eds.). Bulletins of American Paleontology 363: 1–560. Sepkoski's Online Genus Database (CEPHALOPODA)

Prehistoric nautiloid genera